Summer Storm Festival is an annual music festival which takes place in Bangalore, India at the Palace Grounds. The inaugural edition of the Festival was held on 15 May 2010, headlined by American metal band Lamb of God. 
A number of Indian opening and support bands were also part of the event.

Significance
The Summer Storm Festival promises to be in the same vein of the Deccan Rock festival in that both festivals promote Hard Rock and Metal acts and does not bow to commercial or corporate pressures to have pop or radio friendly musicians performing. It is widely regarded as the biggest metal festival in the country, with thousands of metal fans from across India and abroad coming down to witness the event in the city of Bangalore every summer after the failure of the Rock 'n India festival leaning towards the more radio friendly pop genre from 2010 onwards.

2010 Line Up
Lamb of God
Bhoomi
Scribe
Boomarang
Extinct Reflections

2012 Line Up
Opeth
Suidakra
Nothnegal
 Eccentric Pendulum
 Theorized

Sponsors
The Summer Storm Festival is being promoted and produced by Overture India, an event management company based in Bangalore.
Ticketing partners for the festival are Indian online ticketing company Kyazoonga. Red Romanov, a division of UB group and VH1 India jumped onto the bandwagon of sponsors at the last minute to gain some commercial mileage for their own brands after seeing a positive reaction from fans.

References

Heavy metal festivals in India
Rock festivals in India
Culture of Bangalore
Events in Bangalore
Festivals in Karnataka